Live: In Paradise is a live concert DVD by American dark cabaret duo The Dresden Dolls.

The Dresden Dolls hosted a free concert at the Paradise Rock Club in Boston on June 5, 2005. When a power outage unexpectedly delayed their performance, city streets became a temporary stage for some of the many performers (living statues, stilt-walkers, and fire-breathers) who had come from across the world to entertain audiences. The entire event—both concert and street performances—was filmed and the resulting DVD was released on November 22, 2005.

Track listing 

 "Good Day" – 5:35
 "Missed Me" – 4:49
 "War Pigs" – 11:24
 "Perfect Fit" – 5:40
 "Christopher Lydon" – 4:57
 "Bad Habit" – 3:29
 "Half Jack" – 10:23
 "Girl Anachronism" – 4:39
 "Pierre" – 6:21
 "Truce" – 8:21

 Bonus features

Live at Roskilde Festival, Denmark 2005

 "Coin-Operated Boy" – 5:34
 "Girl Anachronism" – 3:18

Bonus videos

 "Coin-Operated Boy" – 3:43
 "Girl Anachronism" – 3:01
 "A Life in the Day of The Dresden Dolls" (documentary) – 53:54
 Preshow Featurette – 19:37

Personnel 

 Amanda Palmer - vocals, piano
 Brian Viglione - drums, vocals, guitar, bass
 Michael Pope – director
 Zea Barker – production design
 Pierre Lamoureux – producer
 Michael Pope – editor
 Zea Barker - co-editor
 Christopher Lydon – Master of Ceremonies
 Noah Blumenson-Cook – Production Coordinator
 Lee Barron – concert camera operator
 Maria Gambale – concert camera operator
 Michael Hobbs – concert camera operator
 James Holland – concert camera operator
 Wayne Kimball – concert camera operator
 Jake Liman – concert camera operator
 Dave McGlocklin – concert camera operator
 Scott Patterson – concert camera operator
 Robert Beinhocker – assistant camera
 Tom Buehler – camera system assistant
 Ben Vaughn – senior video engineer
 Scott Morabito – film lighting

 Doug Martin – video engineer
 Christina Bryant - art department key
 Jake Flowers – art department crew
 Brian Metzendorf – art department crew
 Davina Yannetty – art department crew
 Stephen Martin – production assistant
 Becca Rosenthal - "Special Thanks"
 Francois Lamoureux – audio producer
 Lonnie Bedell – recording engineer
 Greg Hanawalt – recording assistant
 Joel Simches - live audio
 Dave MacNamara - monitor mix
 Ron Nordin - still photography
 Bona Weiss - still photography
 Sheri Hausey - still photography
 Jeff Wasilko - still photography
 Kyle Cassidy - still photography
 Barnaby Whitfield - cover artwork
 Ben Richter - additional music
 Brian Carpenter / The Beat Circus - additional music

External links 
 Director's official site

Live video albums
2005 live albums
2005 video albums
The Dresden Dolls albums
Roadrunner Records live albums
Roadrunner Records video albums